Tessa Pullan from Rutland, (born 1953) is an English sculptor.

Biography

Pullan was from 1971 to 1974 in France apprenticed to the sculptor John Skeaping and then gained a diploma from 1974 to 1977 at the City and Guilds of London Art School. She studied from 1977 to 1980 from the Royal Academy of Arts in London.

Her first exhibition took place in 1976 at London's Guildhall Art Gallery. In 1980 she started her first studio. The philanthropist and horse breeder Paul Mellon commissioned the Civil War Horse for the National Sporting Library and Museum in Middleburg, Virginia, honouring the horses and mules who died during the American Civil War.  Her bust of Mellon is in the National Portrait Gallery.
She is now one of Britain's leading animal sculptors, working in a variety of media, but mainly bronze and wood. She also produces portraits. The artist has a studio in Barrowden, Rutland since 1990 and studios in Sandwich, Aberystwyth and Berkhamsted.

She is a member of the Society of Equestrian Artists.

Equine Sculptures
The racehorse, Sea Hero, won the Kentucky Derby in 1993 and Pullan was tasked with creating a sculpture of him at the National Sporting Library and Museum. Created in bronze, the horse is over 7 ft and 2 tons in weight.

The 1996 "Horse and Rider" galvanised steel statue on the Black Country Route, Wolverhampton was commissioned by Wolverhampton City Council. Pullan carved the sculpture using wood and then the model was scaled up and produced in steel by Arden Fabrications of Knowle.

Pullan was given instructions by Paul Mellon to make a bronze, three-quarter size statue of a Civil War Horse. As part of her research, she contacted the Society for the Prevention of Cruelty to Animals for images of abused horses to influence the oppressive appearance of the statue. On 17 September 1997, the statue was unveiled by the Virginia Historical Society.

Some works
 Untitled (1977) Gonville Place in Cambridge
 1993 Kentucky Derby winner Sea Hero (1993), Rokeby Stables, Upperville in Fauquier County, Virginia
 Civil War Horse (1997): 1, National Sporting Library in Middleburg, Virginia; 2, U.S. Cavalry Museum at Fort Riley, Kansas; and 3, Virginia Historical Society in Richmond, Virginia
 Horse and Rider, Black Country Route, Bilston

External links
 Artist website

References

1953 births
English sculptors
Equine artists
Modern sculptors
People from Rutland
Living people